Vasily Petrovich Vereshchagin (13 January 1835, in Perm – 22 October 1909, in Saint Petersburg) was a Russian portraitist, history painter and illustrator.

Biography 
His father, Pyotr Prokopovich (1795-1843) and grandfather, Prokopy Danilovich (1764-c.1811) were painters. His brothers, Pyotr and Mitrofan (1842-1894) became painters as well. His first art lessons came from his father while he was attending the public schools. He also worked with his maternal grandfather, a local icon painter named Ivan Babin.

In 1856, he enrolled at the Imperial Academy of Arts and studied with Alexey Markov. He remained there for six years and was awarded a gold medal for his painting of Sophia of Lithuania at the wedding of her son, Vasily the Blind. Later, thanks to a stipend from the Academy, he was able to study in Europe, especially Rome, where he copied the Old Masters, and won a gold medal at the International Exposition in Paris in 1867.

Upon his return to Saint Petersburg in 1869, he presented two large paintings with several portraits and watercolors and was appointed a Professor of history and portrait painting at the Academy, a position he held for twenty years. The following year, he created decorations on themes from Russian folk poetry in the palace of Grand Duke Vladimir.

In 1873, he received another gold medal at the Vienna Exposition, and did further decorative work at the Cathedral of Christ the Saviour (1875-1879) and in the Assumption Cathedral of the Kiev Pechersk Lavra. In 1891, he published an album, featuring portraits of notable people and scenes from history, which became very popular. After his health began to fail, he presented many of his paintings, and some by his late brother Pyotr, to the "Scientific Industrial Museum" in Perm, towards the goal of creating a separate art department there.

Selected paintings

References

External links

 ArtNet: More works by V.P. Vereshchagin

1835 births
1909 deaths
History painters
Genre painters
People from Perm, Russia
Russian illustrators
19th-century painters from the Russian Empire
Russian male painters
Imperial Academy of Arts alumni
Awarded with a large gold medal of the Academy of Arts
19th-century male artists from the Russian Empire